C.D. Mock is the former head wrestling coach for the University of North Carolina at Chapel Hill. The UNC Wrestling Team is a Division I NCAA program competing in the Atlantic Coast Conference. Mock is a UNC alumnus as well. During his time as a student at UNC, he became the school's first wrestling national champion in 1982.   He served as UNC's head coach for from 2003–2015.

Early life and high school career 

CD Mock was born in 1958 in Saint Petersburg, Florida. He grew up in Pennsylvania in a town close to Philadelphia known as Newtown. Mock wrestled for four seasons while attending high school in his home town of Newtown Pennsylvania, at Council Rock High School. During his Senior year in 1978, Mock won a Pennsylvania state title. His wrestling career started in a very unorthodox fashion. Mock was a gymnast until he was first introduced to wrestling his freshman year of high school; an age at which most successful wrestlers have already been competing for several years. Mock immediately took to the sport and made haste catching up with his competition, making up for his lack in experience with hard work. The University of North Carolina at Chapel Hill's student run newspaper, the Daily Tar Heel, did an article about Coach Mock in 2010 that sheds some light on Mock's work ethic throughout his early career. "While other kids spent their youth playing catch, Mock played catch-up. In the mornings Mock forfeited the bus ride and ran the four-and-a-half miles to school instead."

College career 

In 1982, Conrad Davis Mock became The University of North Carolina at Chapel Hill’s first NCAA champion. He finished his 1982 season a 35-0 record en route to the national title at 134 pounds. En route to his National Championship title, Mock earned three ACC conference titles. He posted a career record of 108-9 and also had a career record of 64-4 in ACC competition. He was a two time NCAA All-American and had the third highest winning percentage in North Carolina history.

Post college and coaching career 

CD Mock graduated with a degree in 1982. After graduating he returned to his hometown in Newtown, Pennsylvania, and became the president of Equity Consultants Company. Along with this he became the High School wrestling coach at his alma mater Council Rock High.  CD Mock grabbed the reigns of the UNC wrestling team when he became head coach in the 2003-04 season. Upon his hiring, he guided the Tar Heels to back to back ACC titles in 2005 and 2006.  In the spring of 2006 the Tar Heels claimed their second team title as ACC Champions. Individual champions Garrett Atkinson (165), Alex Maciag (174), and Jared Royer (133) helped clinch the Tar Heels ACC title. The Tar Heels posted a 16-8-1 dual meet record that season with a record of 3-2-1 in the ACC.

The Tar Heel team of 2013 ended the season with five National Qualifiers; Nathan Kraisser (125), Joey Ward (133),John-Michael Staudenmeyer (165),and Alex Utley (184) with one wrestler achieving All-American status Evan Henderson (141). In the 2014 season, the Tar Heels had similar accolades with four National Qualifiers and a returning All-American Evan Henderson at the 141 pound weight class where he placed fourth. The team finished in a tie for twenty fifth place with a team score of 15.5 points. 

In 2015, Mock was removed from the position of the head coach of the UNC wrestling team. Mock believes he was fired for speaking out against his son’s experience with Title IX at the University of Tennessee at Chattanooga. He was assisted by Associate Head Coach and Olympian Cary Kolat, as well as assistant coaches Dionisios Papadatos and Trevor Chinn.

Family 

CD Mock currently lives in Chapel Hill. Mock married Mickie Robinson in 1984, two years after graduating from The University of North Carolina at Chapel Hill. Mickie is also a UNC graduate and a former member of the UNC gymnastics team. She currently works for Duke Urgent Care as a physician’s assistant. Their first child, Chelsea, attended culinary school in Italy and is currently a sous chef at Kipos restaurant located on Franklin Street in Chapel Hill. Their second child, Corey, wrestled at North Carolina for two seasons before transferring to UT Chattanooga.

References

External links 

1958 births
Living people
American wrestling coaches
People from St. Petersburg, Florida
North Carolina Tar Heels wrestlers
North Carolina Tar Heels wrestling coaches